Salway is an English surname. Notable persons with this name include:

Benet Salway, late 20th and early 21st century British historian
Francis Salway (born 1957), British businessman
Joseph Salway early 19th century British artist and surveyor
Peter Salway (born 1932), British historian
Ted Salway (1891–1950), British footballer